St John the Baptist's Church, Dethick is a Grade II* listed parish church in the Church of England in Dethick, Derbyshire.

History

The church was founded in 1279 by Geoffrey Dethick, and Thomas de Wathenowe, the Prior of Felley Priory in Nottinghamshire  as a private chapel to Dethick Manor.

It is all of this early date with the exception of the tower which was added by Sir Antony Babington, between 1530 as noted on a date stone over the west door, and 1532, as noted on the richly decorated band of the tower.

Parish status
The church is in a joint parish with 
St Giles' Church, Matlock
Christ Church, Holloway
St John the Baptist's Chapel, Matlock Bath

Organ
The pipe organ is a Positive Organ Company instrument. A specification of the organ can be found on the National Pipe Organ Register.

See also
Grade II* listed buildings in Amber Valley
Listed buildings in Dethick, Lea and Holloway

References

Dethick
Dethick